The Mansion or The Mansions may refer to:

Books
 The Interior Castle, also known as The Mansions (1577), a spiritual guide written by Teresa of Ávila
 The Mansion (novel), a 1959 book written by novelist William Faulkner

Buildings
 The Mansion (Baguio), the official summer residence of the President of the Philippines
 The Mansion, a catering hall at the Main Street Complex in Voorhees, New Jersey
 The Mansion (recording studio), a Los Angeles mansion owned by music producer Rick Rubin
 The Mansion, Berkhamsted, a historic property on Castle Hill in Berkhamsted, Hertfordshire, England
 The Mansion Restaurant, a restaurant in Dallas, Texas
 The Mansions, common name for Ruthven Mansions and The Mansions Tavern in the arcade beneath

Entertainment and music
 The Mansion (TV series), an Australian satirical news program
 "The Mansion", a song by John Vanderslice from his album Life and Death of an American Fourtracker
 "The Mansion", a song by Manchester Orchestra from the album Cope
 "The Mansion", a song by the Microphones from the album The Glow Pt. 2

See also
 Mansion (disambiguation)
 Playboy: The Mansion, 2005 video game